Robert Bransby Cooper (1762–1845), of Furney Hill, Dursley, Gloucestershire, was an English politician.

He was the son of Samuel Cooper, a clergyman of the Church of England and Maria Susanna Bransby, the author of several novels, and brother to noted surgeon Astley Cooper and uncle to Bransby Blake Cooper.

He was a Member (MP) of the Parliament of England for Gloucester 1818 to 1830.

References

1762 births
1845 deaths
People from Dursley
Members of the Parliament of the United Kingdom for English constituencies
UK MPs 1818–1820
UK MPs 1820–1826
UK MPs 1826–1830